O21 may refer to:

 O21 (film), a 2014 Pakistani action thriller film
 Hoopa Airport in Humboldt County, California, United States
 , of the Royal Netherlands Navy
 , a submarine of this class
 O21 scale, a model railway scale
 Otoyol 21, a motorway in Turkey
 Oxygen-21, an isotope of oxygen
 Thomas-Morse O-21, an observation aircraft of the United States Army Air Corps

See also 
021 (disambiguation), with a zero in place of the letter O